Svetlana Kuznetsova and Elena Likhovtseva were the defending champions, but Kuznetsova did not compete this year. Likhovtseva teamed up with Magdalena Maleeva and successfully defended her title, by defeating Maria Elena Camerin and Silvia Farina Elia 6–3, 5–7, 6–1 in the final.

Seeds

Draw

Draw

External links
 Main and Qualifying draws

Uncle
2005 Uncle Tobys Hardcourts